Anolis higuey, the Cordillera Oriental stout anole, is a species of lizard in the family Dactyloidae. It is endemic to the eastern Dominican Republic.

References

Anoles
Lizards of the Caribbean
Reptiles of the Dominican Republic
Endemic fauna of the Dominican Republic
Reptiles described in 2019
Taxa named by Stephen Blair Hedges
Taxa named by Gunther Köhler
Taxa named by Kathleen McGrath (herpetologist)
Taxa named by Caroline Zimmer